Strip House is a privately owned fine dining chain of steakhouses with locations in New York City and Las Vegas. All locations have smaller, separate rooms for private dining.

History and management
The original Strip House was opened in New York City in 2000 by Restaurateurs Peter, Penny, and Mathew Glazier of The Glazier Group. The kitchens are overseen by Executive Chef John Schenk. In 2011, New York restaurant owner BR Guest Hospitality purchased the brand and three restaurants in Manhattan, Houston, and Las Vegas, while The Glazier Group maintains the remaining eateries.

Fare

Signature prime cuts include: New York Strip, filet mignon, bone-in rib eye, center cut chateaubriand and a classic porterhouse. Strip House is known for its minimal seasoning. In addition to steaks, the restaurants also serve, lobster, fish, veal, and rack of lamb.

Side dishes range from the signature black truffle creamed spinach, French fries with herbs and garlic, to goose-fat potatoes. Strip House also offers a dessert menu featuring their signature 24 layer chocolate cake. Strip House offers an extensive beer and wine list including 250 wines from around the globe and a cocktail menu.

Interior
All Strip House restaurants were designed by David Rockwell of the Rockwell Group. The interior features a collection of Studio Manassé (de) portraits of burlesque stars from the 1920s.

See also
 List of restaurants in New York City
 List of steakhouses

References

External links
 
 The New York Times
 Zagat.com Review

2000 establishments in New York City
Steakhouses in the United States
Restaurants in Manhattan
Restaurants established in 2000
Greenwich Village